Saint-Christophe is a railway station in Saint-Christophe-Vallon, Aveyron, Occitanie, France. The station is on the Capdenac–Rodez railway line. The station is served by Intercités de nuit (night train) and TER (local) services operated by SNCF.

Train services
The following services currently call at Saint-Christophe:
night services (Intercités de nuit) Paris–Orléans–Figeac–Rodez–Albi
local service (TER Occitanie) Brive-la-Gaillarde–Figeac–Rodez

References

Railway stations in Aveyron